The 1964 United States presidential election in Indiana took place on November 3, 1964, as part of the 1964 United States presidential election. State voters chose 13 representatives, or electors, to the Electoral College, who voted for president and vice president.

Before this election, Indiana had not voted Democratic since Franklin D. Roosevelt‘s 46-state landslide of 1936, although native son Wendell Willkie in 1940 and Thomas E. Dewey in 1948 only won by very narrow margins. The pre-election period in the Hoosier State was highlighted by a dramatic Democratic primary challenge from Alabama Governor George Wallace, who won considerable backlash white support in suburban areas. However, Wallace lost by worse than one-to-two against solitary opponent Matthew E. Welsh in Indiana and never had any hope of beating incumbent Lyndon Johnson in the presidential race.

 Republican candidate Barry Goldwater naturally considered Indiana to be a critical state, given its historical GOP loyalty, and campaigned in the state in October, arguing, to a severely hostile reaction, that America should use nuclear weapons in Vietnam.

The state was won by incumbent President Lyndon B. Johnson (D–Texas), with 55.98% of the popular vote, against Senator Barry Goldwater (R–Arizona), with 43.56% of the popular vote. Powerful hostility to Goldwater's leanings from its Yankee and Appalachia-influenced Northern and Southern regions allowed Johnson to carry the state, although Indiana was still 10.16% more Republican than the nation at-large.

Indiana would not vote Democratic again until Barack Obama narrowly won the state in 2008, and 1964 remains the last time that a Democrat has carried the state with a majority of the vote.

This is the solitary occasion since the Civil War when Randolph County and Wabash County have voted for a Democratic presidential candidate. , this is the last election in which the following counties voted for a Democratic presidential candidate: Allen, Adams, Bartholomew, Brown, Benton, Carroll, Cass, Clay, Clinton, Daviess, Decatur, DeKalb, Elkhart, Fayette, Fountain, Franklin, Grant, Hancock, Henry, Howard, Huntington, Jackson, Jay, Jennings, LaGrange, Lawrence, Marshall, Miami, Montgomery, Noble, Orange, Parke, Pulaski, Putnam, Ripley, Shelby, Tipton, Warren, Wells, White, and Whitley; Tippecanoe County would not vote for a Democrat again until it voted for Obama in 2008.

Results

Results by county

See also
 United States presidential elections in Indiana

References

Indiana
1964
1964 Indiana elections